Dzintra Grundmane (born 1944 in Riga) was a Latvian basketball player. She is a recipient of the Order of the Three Stars.

References

Basketball players from Riga
1944 births
Living people
University of Latvia alumni